This list of isthmuses is an appendix to the article isthmus. The list is sorted by the region of the world in which the isthmus is located. A tombolo is an isthmus that consists of a spit or bar.

Africa

Egypt 
 Isthmus of Mansheya which developed around the man-made Heptastadion connecting the island of Pharos to mainland Alexandria.

Americas

Argentina 
 Istmo Carlos Ameghino, Province of Chubut
 Quetrihué Isthmus of Quetrihué Peninsula in Nahuel Huapi Lake

Brazil 
 Isthmus at Nova Brasilia, Mel Island, Paraná

British Overseas Territories 
 Isthmus of East Falkland

Canada 
 Isthmus of Avalon
 Isthmus of Chignecto
 Sechelt Isthmus
 Niagara Peninsula

Central America 

 Isthmus of Panama
 Isthmus of Rivas, Nicaragua

Chile 
 Isthmus of Brunswick Peninsula
 Isthmus of Muñoz Gamero Peninsula
 Ofqui Isthmus, Aisén Region

French Overseas Collectivity 
 Isthmus of La Dune

Mexico 
 Isthmus of Tehuantepec, Mexico

United States 
 Isthmus of Catalina Island
 Madison Isthmus
 Seattle, Washington
 Point Peninsula, New York
 Maui, Hawai'i

Venezuela 
 Médanos Isthmus – links mainland Venezuela to Paraguaná

Asia 

 The Caucasus region connecting Europe to Asia between the Black Sea and Caspian Sea is sometimes considered an isthmus.
 The Isthmus of Kra connecting Malay Peninsula with the mainland of Asia located in southern Thailand.
 The Sinai Peninsula forms the Isthmus of Suez between the Mediterranean Sea and Red Sea and also forms the Asian border area towards Africa.
 The central area of Kushimoto town in the Wakayama prefecture of Japan is located on a narrow isthmus, surrounded on both sides by the Pacific Ocean.
 Metro Manila in the Philippines is situated on an isthmus.
 Tayabas Isthmus separates Bicol Region and Bondoc Peninsula from the rest of Luzon in the Philippines.
 The area around Jimbaran and the Denpasar airport connects the Nusa Dua peninsula with the main part of Bali in Indonesia.
 Isthmus of Korea between Sea of Japan and Yellow Sea.
Mount Hakodate is connected to mainland Hakodate by an isthmus. The main part of the present urban area lies on the isthmus. The night view of the isthmus from Mount Hakodate is considered one of the best night views of Japan.
 Portas do Cerco, the northernmost part of Península de Macau, where the peninsula is connected to the rest of Hsiangshan Island.

Europe

Black Sea 
 Isthmus of Perekop between Crimea and mainland Europe

Iceland 
 Isthmus between Gilsfjörður and Bitrufjörður, which connects the Westfjords peninsula to the mainland of Iceland

Ireland 
 Cape Clear Island
 Sutton, Dublin
 Belmullet, Mayo

Mediterranean Sea 
 Isthmus of Catanzaro, which connects the toe of Italy to the rest of the Italian peninsula
 Isthmus of Corinth, which connects the Peloponnese peninsula to the rest of Greece
 Isthmus of Gibraltar
 Isthmus of Potidea, connecting the Kassandra peninsula with the mainland of Greece
 Isthmus of Ierapetra, which connects the eastern end of Crete to the rest of the island.
 Isthmus of Capo Testa, connecting Capo Testa peninsula (Santa Teresa Gallura), with the mainland of Sardinia

Russia 
 Karelian Isthmus between Lake Ladoga and the Baltic Sea (Gulf of Finland)
 Poyasok Isthmus between Sea of Okhotsk and Sea of Japan
 Olonets Isthmus between Lake Onega and Lake Ladoga
 Onega Peninsula between Lake Onega and the White Sea (Onega Bay)
 Chivyrkuy Isthmus between Chivyrkuy Bay and Barguzin Bay of the Lake Baikal, connecting Svyatoy Nos Peninsula to the mainland
 Bolshoy Volok Isthmus between Malaya Volokovaya Bay and Motovsky Gulf, connecting Sredny Peninsula to the mainland
 Maly Volok Isthmus between Bolshaya Volokovaya Bay and Motovsky Gulf, connecting Rybachy Peninsula to Sredny Peninsula

United Kingdom and British islands 
 the land bridge or isthmus connecting Britain and France in prehistoric times, often referred to in Early Modern literature
 La Coupée isthmus in Sark, Channel Islands
 Forth-Clyde isthmus in Scotland
 The isthmus connecting Langness Peninsula, Isle of Man, to the rest of the island
 Mavis Grind isthmus in Shetland
 The isthmus connecting the Isle of Portland to the mainland
 Rhins of Galloway isthmus in Wigtownshire (where Stranraer is situated), Scotland
 Tarbert is the name of several places at isthmuses in Scotland and Ireland. The translation from Old Irish is isthmus or portage-place ("across carry").
 The isthmus connecting Stornoway, Isle of Lewis in Scotland to the Eye Peninsula
 Hugh Town is located on an isthmus connecting the Hugh to the remainder of St Mary's, the largest of the Isles of Scilly
 Gugh, linked by a tombolo to St Agnes, both being inhabited islands of the Isles of Scilly

Oceania

Australia 
 Eaglehawk Neck near Port Arthur, Tasmania
 The Neck in Bruny Island, Tasmania connecting North and South Bruny
 Maria Island, Tasmania
 Yanakie Isthmus, connects Wilsons Promontory to mainland Victoria
 Barrenjoey Headland, New South Wales.
 Tuross Head, New South Wales on the NSW South Coast.

New Zealand 
 Auckland isthmus between Northland Peninsula and the rest of New Zealand's North Island
 Rongotai isthmus, location of Wellington International Airport
 "The Flat" of South Dunedin connects the Otago Peninsula to the South Island mainland
 The Neck is an inland isthmus between lakes Wanaka and Hāwea
 The town of Mount Maunganui is situated on a tombolo isthmus connecting the volcanic cone of Mount Maunganui with the North Island mainland

See also 
 List of straits

References

Isthmuses